Guy Debelle is an Australian economist who is the former Deputy Governor of the Reserve Bank of Australia, having been appointed in 2016.

Career 
In 2022, after 7 years as Deputy Governor and 25 years at the RBA Debelle unexpectedly resigned from his post at the Reserve Bank of Australia, pursuing a position at clean energy non-profit Fortescue Future Industries.

He is the Chief Financial Officer of Fortescue Future Industries, a global green energy company committed to producing zero-carbon green hydrogen from 100 per cent renewable sources. FFI aims to decarbonise hard-to-abate sectors and is responsible for the decarbonisation of its parent company - Fortescue Metals Group -  founded by Dr Andrew Forrest AO.

Debelle also chairs the climate change working group at the Australian Council of Financial Regulators.

Education 
Debelle attended St Peter's College in Adelaide, South Australia and was the Dux of the school in 1983, his graduating year. 
Debelle graduated from the University of Adelaide with a Bachelor of Economics (hons) in 1987. He completed a PhD in economics at Massachusetts Institute of Technology supervised by Stanley Fischer. Debelle is also a Queen's Scout, awarded in 1983.

Publications 

 Debelle, Guy. & Stevens, Glenn. & Reserve Bank of Australia. Economic Research Department. (1995). Monetary policy goals for inflation in Australia. Sydney, NSW: Economic Research Dept., Reserve Bank of Australia.

References 

Living people
Australian economists
University of Adelaide alumni
Massachusetts Institute of Technology alumni
Year of birth missing (living people)